Silak (also Romanized as Sīlak; also known as Sīlakdarreh) is a village in Darjazin-e Sofla Rural District, Qorveh-e Darjazin District, Razan County, Hamadan Province, Iran. At the 2006 census, its population was 263, in 52 families.

References 

Populated places in Razan County